Revolutionary Guard may refer to:

 Revolutionary Guard Corps of Libya
 Islamic Revolutionary Guard Corps of Iran

See also
 Republican guard